Cochylimorpha pyramidana is a species of moth of the family Tortricidae. It is found in Spain, the Near East, Russia (Sarepta, Uralsk, Guberli), Armenia and Kazakhstan.

The wingspan is 16–19 mm. Adults have been recorded on wing from June to August.

References

Moths described in 1871
Cochylimorpha
Moths of Europe
Moths of Asia